According to this census, the population of Turkey is 83,614,362. It was determined that 41,915,985 of the population was male and 41,698,377 were female.

Populations of the provinces

References 

Censuses in Turkey
2020 in Turkey
2020 censuses